Trabala aethiopica is a moth of the family Lasiocampidae. The species was first described by Embrik Strand in 1912. It is found in the Democratic Republic of the Congo and Equatorial Guinea.

References

Lasiocampidae
Moths of Africa
Moths described in 1912